Saint Joseph's Seminary was an American Roman Catholic educational institution located in Plainsboro, New Jersey, though with an address in Princeton, New Jersey. It was founded in 1914 and was operated by the Congregation of the Mission, better known as the Vincentian Fathers, for the formation of their members and other candidates to the Catholic priesthood.  The school closed in 1992 and a retreat center occupied the site until 2009. The Mother of God Orthodox Church had also occupied a small portion of the seminary until 2015 when American Boychoir School had been relocated there. The site is now home to private schools, but the Chapel of the Miraculous Medal is now home to the Princeton Abbey and Cemetery. The Abbey is now a public cemetery and event space for the Princeton area.

Marillac Campus

The complex is currently referred to as the Marillac Campus, after Saint Louise de Marillac, and the Vincentians rent space to a number of private schools, including the Wilberforce School, a Classical Christian school, the French American School of Princeton,  and the Laurel School.  The campus was also formerly home to the American Boychoir School which has since closed.

Notable alumni
 The Very Rev. Joseph L. Levesque, C.M., President of St. John's University, Queens, New York
The Very Rev. Joseph T. Cahill, C.M., President of St. John's University, Queens, New York

Gallery

References

External links
Princeton Abbey and Cemetery, which operates a non-sectarian cemetery on the grounds
French American School of Princeton
Laurel School of Princeton
Eastern Province USA Vincentians

Vincentian schools
Catholic seminaries in the United States
Educational institutions established in 1914
1914 establishments in New Jersey
Roman Catholic Diocese of Metuchen
Seminaries and theological colleges in New Jersey